Karl E. Brinkmann GmbH (also known as KEB) is a family-owned business from Barntrup, Germany. It specializes in manufacturing motion control devices contained in almost all kinds of appliances and machines. With an international customer base and offices throughout Europe, China, Japan, Russia and the US, KEB employs more than 1,200 people and generates revenues of over €170 million annually.

External links
 Official website
 KEB America subsidiary website

References

Electronics companies of Germany
Manufacturing companies of Germany
Electronics companies established in 1972
1972 establishments in West Germany